Bidysderina is a genus of spiders in the family Oonopidae. It was first described in 2013 by Platnick et al.. , it contains 5 species, all from Ecuador.

References

Oonopidae
Araneomorphae genera
Spiders of South America